Richard J. Nolan (January 1, 1848 – August 26, 1905) served in the United States Army during the American Indian Wars. He received the Medal of Honor.

Nolan was born on January 1, 1848, in Ireland. His official residence was listed as Milwaukee, Wisconsin. He joined the army from Fort Totten, Dakota Territory in September 1886, and was discharged in August 1891. He died on August 26, 1905, and was buried at the United States Soldiers' and Airmen's Home National Cemetery in Washington, D.C.

Medal of Honor citation
His award citation reads:
For bravery in action on 30 December 1890, while serving with Company I, 7th U.S. Cavalry, in action at White Clay Creek, South Dakota.

See also

List of Medal of Honor recipients for the Indian Wars

References

1848 births
1905 deaths
19th-century Irish people
Irish soldiers in the United States Army
United States Army soldiers
American military personnel of the Indian Wars
United States Army Medal of Honor recipients
Military personnel from Milwaukee
Irish-born Medal of Honor recipients
Burials at United States Soldiers' and Airmen's Home National Cemetery
American Indian Wars recipients of the Medal of Honor
Pine Ridge Campaign